Cory Antony Harris (born 7 December 1979) is a Greek baseball player who competed in the 2004 Summer Olympics.

References

1979 births
Living people
Greek baseball players
Olympic baseball players of Greece
Baseball players at the 2004 Summer Olympics
Place of birth missing (living people)